Drake of the 99 Dragons is a third-person shooter video game developed by Swedish studio Idol FX and published by Majesco Sales. The game stars Drake, an undead assassin who is on a quest to avenge his murdered clan, the 99 Dragons, by recovering their ancient "Soul Portal Artifact" from antagonist Tang. Tang intends on using the artifact to harvest the souls of dead beings and power his undead cyborg army.

Idol FX intended for Drake of the 99 Dragons to be the launchpad for a multimedia franchise, which would include comics and a potential animated television series. However, these plans were scrapped due to the game's negative reception, and is often noted as one of the worst video games ever made. On March 7, 2018, the Microsoft Windows port of the game was rereleased on Steam.

Gameplay
Drake has a number of special moves, such as the abilities to double jump and to run up walls. He also has the ability to slow down time. Drake's health depends primarily on absorbing the souls of his fallen opponents, although there are also red "lost souls" which deplete Drake's health.

As a means of defense, Drake uses a wide arrangement of guns and firearms. The player is able to control two guns by using the left and right triggers. In the Xbox version, an aiming reticle (a common staple of third-person shooters) is excluded; instead, an auto-targeting feature is implemented to help Drake aim and fire at the player's enemies. In the PC version, however, an aiming reticle is used.

Plot
Drake is the premier assassin of a Hong Kong based clan known as the 99 Dragons. While training in the Kwoon, he hears a break in. He enters the chamber containing the Soul Portal Artifact, given to the clan over 3000 years ago, battling enemies before a mysterious Ghost Assassin swoops out of the room with the artifact. The assassin is in cahoots with Tang, a businessman and the clan's mortal enemy. Drake then pursues the assassin, but is unable to stop the villain when he phases out of a window of the penthouse. He returns to the Master's chamber, only to find the corpses of himself, the Master, and the other members of his clan.

Shocked, Drake collapses, and the tattoo on his chest glows. In a flashback, Drake is given the tattoo of the Undying Dragon by The Master, which provides him with supernatural powers as well as immortality. The tattoo glows, and Drake unleashes the abilities to run up walls, slow down time, and freeze time. He explores the penthouse and collects thirty souls of his fallen comrades and enemies. When the powers go to Drake's head, he leaps out a window and falls to his death. He then awakens in the Spirit Realm and is scolded by the four Spirit Gods. They inform him that he must collect more souls for the Undying Dragon and recover the Soul Portal Artifact in order to avenge his Master's death. They give him a new body and return him to the mortal realm. He pursues a courier and follows his blood trail to a fireworks factory. Drake shoots at him but is killed in a sudden explosion.

The gods, annoyed once more at Drake's lack of competence, bring him back to life and send him to the House of the Dreaming Cloud casino. There, Drake attempts to find the courier but is attacked by the casino's owner Pok and his demon dogs. After defeating Pok, Drake tails the courier to the Hung Fook Casino Palace, where it turns out he lost the Soul Portal Artifact in a gambling match. A thug beats Chun to near-death for his mishap, but Drake saves his life in time and learns the location of the Soul Portal Artifact. Drake quickly sets off through the city, fending off biker gangs along the way, and returns to the House of the Dreaming Cloud.

While fighting Pok, now in his "true" demonic form, Drake once again gets caught up in an explosion. Serpent-Eye Sung, a business partner and accomplice of Tang, steals the Soul Portal Artifact from a dying Drake and heads off to his canned seafood factory, where they are harvesting the soul from an albino orca. Drake goes to stop Serpent-Eye and take the Artifact back but is attacked by Tang's henchwoman Banshee and killed once more. The Spirit Gods decide to cut their losses and send Drake back to the penthouse, where the Tang Undertakers are stealing the corpses of the 99 Dragons. Drake chases after a truck holding his master's body and finds himself taken to a cyborg creation facility. There, he finds that Master has been turned into a cyborg, but manages to defeat the robot and retrieve his Master's body from the remains.

Outraged, Drake decides to go after Tang. Upon infiltrating Tang Towers, he discovers Tang's true scheme: to use the artifact to reap the souls from the Spirit Realm and use those souls to power his cyborg army. Drake then breaks into Tang's secret morgue facility and recaptures his clan members' souls. He then travels to the basements of the facility, where Tang is using the artifact to open the portal to the spirit realm. Drake fights and defeats a demon-like creature, but the Ghost Assassin steals the Soul Portal Artifact and escapes into the spirit realm. Drake enters the realm and pursues the assassin, ultimately defeating him. He then retrieves the Soul Portal Artifact and collects the Master's soul.

Drake then falls down to a nest of a three-headed beast called the Spirit Lord Supreme and defeats it. Drake then goes back to the Serene Garden and revives the Master with the artifact. Master thanks Drake for his efforts, stating that he achieved a level of proficiency even he was unable to reach, and he has proven himself to the Gods.

Reception

Drake of the 99 Dragons received "generally unfavorable reviews" on both platforms according to the review aggregation website Metacritic. It was ranked as the second-worst game for the original Xbox. In July 2006, X-Play called Drake the single worst game ever released for the Xbox, even going so far as to state that it had eclipsed the game Aquaman: Battle for Atlantis as "the standard by which they rate all bad games". Alex Navarro of GameSpot named it the second worst "frightfully bad" game of 2003 in Halloween 2004, right behind Big Rigs: Over the Road Racing.

The game was criticized for its controls, along with frustrating gameplay. The game's dual-wielding system, in which players could control two guns independently by using the trigger buttons to shoot and an analog stick to aim, was notably criticized for having a poorly-implemented targeting system that made it difficult to aim. Frequent criticism centered around its unwieldy camera that often got stuck or prevented the player from seeing the on-screen action, and was mapped to the same analog stick as the aiming reticle.

The game was also panned for its poor voice acting, low-quality graphics, character animations, and sound design; in particular, GameSpots Navarro felt that the game was a "cacophony of terrible effects and voice acting"—noticing the re-use of stock sounds notably used in AOL Instant Messenger, and comparing the title character's voice to a cross between a game show host and "the Moviefone guy". He also felt that, due to the game's "disjointed" cutscenes and narration, the storyline of the game was nearly incomprehensible.

While Aaron Boulding of IGN praised the game's unique visual appearance and presentation, along with the "bullet time" audio effects whilst slowing down time, he concluded that Drake of the 99 Dragons was "a good idea that went horribly astray and ended up disastrous" and that "there's no need to rent, purchase or entertain the thought of playing this one". GameSpots Navarro considered the Xbox version "an out-and-out failure in every single discernable category".

Reviewing the game retrospectively in light of the Steam release, Luke Winkie of PC Gamer opined that the PC port was "somehow the best version" and credited his assessment with the removal of the notoriously inaccurate auto-aim functionality found in the console versions. While he deemed it "still a bad game," Winkie expressed that he overall enjoyed the experience, and lamented that it had left him nostalgic for the era of video game releases during which Drake had been published. Ultimately, Winkie concluded his retrospective stating that Drake's rerelease was a sign of Majesco "calcifying their legacy" after ceasing active business in the video games market, and that it was ultimately "a triumph" that the game had resurfaced.

References

External links
 

2003 video games
Majesco Entertainment games
North America-exclusive video games
Third-person shooters
Video games developed in Sweden
Video games with cel-shaded animation
Windows games
Xbox games
Video games about zombies
Cancelled PlayStation 2 games
Single-player video games